"I'm in Luv" is a song by American R&B singer Joe. It was written by Darren "J. Dibbs" Jenkins, Teddy Denslow, and Brian Allen for his debut studio album, Everything (1993), while production was overseen by the former. Serving as his debut single, "I'm in Love" reached number 64 on the US Billboard Hot 100 and number 10 on the Hot R&B/Hip-Hop Songs chart, while peaking at number 22 on the UK Singles Chart.

Track listings

Credits and personnel
 Brian Allen  – writer
 Teddy Denslow  – writer
 Darren "J. Dibbs" Jenkins – producer, writer
 Adam Kudzin - recording engineer - audio engineer
 Special Tee – mixing
 Joe Thomas – vocals

Charts

Weekly charts

Year-end charts

References

Joe (singer) songs
1993 debut singles
1993 songs
New jack swing songs